Huron may refer to:

People
 Wyandot people (or Wendat), indigenous to North America
 Wyandot language, spoken by them
 Huron-Wendat Nation, a Huron-Wendat First Nation with a community in Wendake, Quebec
 Nottawaseppi Huron Band of Potawatomi, a band of Potawatomi American Indians, based in Calhoun County, Michigan), are also known as the Huron Potawatomi

Bodies of water
 Lake Huron, one of the North American Great Lakes
 Huron Swamp in Springfield Township, Oakland County, Michigan
 Huron Falls, one of 24 named waterfalls in Ricketts Glen State Park in Pennsylvania
 Huron Lake, in the parish municipality of Lac-aux-Sables, Mékinac Regional County Municipality, Quebec
 Huron River (disambiguation)
 Rivière des Hurons (disambiguation)

Places
Canada

 Lac-Huron, Quebec, an unorganized territory in the Rimouski-Neigette Regional County Municipality
 Huron-Kinloss, a township in Bruce County, Ontario
 Huron East, Ontario, a municipality in Huron County, Ontario
 Huronia, Ontario, historic home of the Huron people until 1649. 
 Rural Municipality of Huron No. 223, a rural municipality of south-central Saskatchewan

United States
 Huron, California, a small city in Fresno County, California
 Huron, Indiana, an unincorporated community in Lawrence County, Indiana
 Huron, Kansas, a city in Atchison County, Kansas
 Huron, Missouri, an unincorporated community
 Huron, Ohio, a city in Erie County, Ohio
 Huron, New York, a town in Wayne County, New York
 Huron (hamlet), New York, a hamlet located in Wayne County, New York
 Huron, South Dakota, a city in Beadle County, South Dakota
 Huron, Tennessee, an unincorporated community
 Huron, Wisconsin, an unincorporated community
 Hurontown, Michigan
 Huron Mountain, Michigan
 Port Huron, Michigan
 Huron Township (disambiguation)

Electoral districts in Canada
Huron—Bruce (formerly known as Huron and Huron—Middlesex), a federal and provincial electoral district in Ontario
Huron South, a historic federal electoral district in Ontario
Huron North, a historic federal electoral district in Ontario
Huron East, a historic federal electoral district in Ontario
Huron West, a historic federal electoral district in Ontario
Huron Centre, a federal electoral district in Ontario

Other geographical features 
Huron Glacier, a glacial flow on Livingston Island in the South Shetland Islands, Antarctica
The Huron Islands, the location of Huron National Wildlife Refuge in Michigan on Lake Superior
The Huron Mountains, a modest range of mountains in the Upper Peninsula of Michigan
Huron National Forest in Michigan
Huron Peak, a mountain in Colorado

Educational institutions
 Huron University, a former institution in South Dakota
 Huron University College, a confederated college of the University of Western Ontario
 Huron University USA in London, an American institution in the United Kingdom, formerly affiliated with Huron University in South Dakota and since become independent
 Huron High School (Ann Arbor, Michigan)
 Huron High School (New Boston, Michigan)
 Huron High School (Ohio)

Military
 Beechcraft C-12 Huron, a series of twin-engine turboprop aircraft
 , a World War II Tribal-class destroyer
 , Iroquois-class destroyer active from 1972 to 2005 
 , a lightvessel launched in 1920 and now a museum ship moored in Pine Grove Park
 , a gunboat acquired by the Union Navy during the American Civil War
 , an iron sloop-rigged screw steam gunboat
 , a US Navy armored cruiser

Music
 Huron (Canadian band), a Canadian rock band active since 2008
 Huron (UK band), an English heavy metal band active since 2007
 Lord Huron, American Indie folk band based in Los Angeles
 Huron Carol, a traditional Canadian Christmas carol

Other uses
 Huron Consulting Group, an international management consulting firm
 L'Ingénu (aka ), a 1767 satirical novella by Voltaire
 "Hurón", either Galictis vittata or Galictis cuja, two related ferret-like mammals from Central and South America
 "Huron" AMD Sempron processor
 Huron Subdivision or Huron Sub, a railway line owned and operated by the Dakota, Minnesota and Eastern Railroad
 Port Huron Statement, the manifesto of the American student activist movement Students for a Democratic Society (SDS)

See also

 
 
 Port Huron (disambiguation)
 Huron County (disambiguation)
 Huron River (disambiguation)
 Hurones, a municipality in the province of Burgos, Castile and León, Spain
 Huron-Wendat (disambiguation)
 Wyandotte (disambiguation)
 Wyandot (disambiguation)
 Wendat (disambiguation)

Language and nationality disambiguation pages